Rattlesnake master may refer to:

 Eryngium aquaticum, rattlesnakemaster; native to eastern North America
 Eryngium yuccifolium, rattlesnake master;  a common herbaceous perennial plant, native to the tallgrass prairies of central North America
 Agave virginica, rattlesnake master; a species of flowering plant related to agaves

See also
 Rattlesnake weed